Liam Paisley (born 27 November 1997) is a professional rugby league footballer who plays as a  forward for the Barrow Raiders in the Betfred Championship.

He played for the Wigan Warriors in the Super League.

In 2018 he made his Super League début for Wigan against the Castleford Tigers.

References

External links
Wigan Warriors profile
SL profile

Living people
Rugby league second-rows
Wigan Warriors players
1997 births